Chukwunyeaka Osondu "Chukki" Eribenne (born 2 November 1980) is an English former professional footballer.

Career
Born in Westminster, London, Eribenne began his career at Coventry City but didn't make an appearance for the first team. He joined AFC Bournemouth in 2000 and scored on his debut against Bristol Rovers, but didn't score any further goals for the club. He had a loan spell at Hereford where he scored twice; both goals coming in a Football League Trophy defeat to Northampton Town. He subsequently moved to Havant & Waterlooville, for whom he was Player of the Year in 2003–04

In summer 2004 Eribenne signed for Weymouth. He was Weymouth's joint top scorer in 2005–06 with 13 goals as they won promotion to the Conference. He later moved to Grays Athletic, before signing for Ebbsfleet United. He was released at the end of the 2007–08 and went to Sutton United. 
After one season at Sutton, Eribenne moved back to the Midlands and signed for his local club Hinckley United. After a season with Hinckley, Eribenne moved on to Ilkeston Town. His short spell was brought to an end after the club dissolved.

Honours
Conference South: 2006
FA Trophy: 2008

References

External links

1980 births
Living people
Footballers from Westminster
English footballers
Association football forwards
Coventry City F.C. players
AFC Bournemouth players
Hereford United F.C. players
Havant & Waterlooville F.C. players
Weymouth F.C. players
Aldershot Town F.C. players
Farnborough F.C. players
Grays Athletic F.C. players
Ebbsfleet United F.C. players
Sutton United F.C. players
Hinckley United F.C. players
Ilkeston Town F.C. (1945) players
English Football League players
National League (English football) players
Helsingborgs IF players